The 2016–17 ISU Junior Grand Prix was the 20th season of a series of junior international competitions organized by the International Skating Union. It was the junior-level complement to the 2016–17 ISU Grand Prix of Figure Skating. Skaters competed for medals in the disciplines of men's singles, ladies' singles, pair skating, and ice dance, as well as for qualifying points. The top six skaters or teams from each discipline met at the 2016–17 Junior Grand Prix Final, which was held together with the senior final.

Competitions
The locations of the JGP events change yearly. In the 2016–17 season, the series was composed of the following events in autumn 2016:

Qualifying
Skaters who reached the age of 13 by July 1, 2016, but had not turned 19 (singles and females of the other two disciplines) or 21 (male pair skaters and ice dancers) were eligible to compete on the junior circuit. Unlike the senior Grand Prix, skaters for the JGP were not seeded by the ISU. The number of entries allotted to each ISU member federation was determined by their skaters' placements at the previous season's Junior World Championships in each discipline.

Overview
The series began in Saint-Gervais-les-Bains, France, on 25 August 2016. On the same day, less than an hour before the start of the ladies' short program, a shuttle bus was involved in an accident, resulting in injuries to two skaters, Anna Tarusina (Russia) and Anželika Kļujeva (Latvia), and their coaches. Making their first JGP appearances, Russia's Roman Savosin and Alina Zagitova won the men's and ladies' titles, respectively. Competing in their fourth JGP season, French ice dancers Angélique Abachkina / Louis Thauron won their first gold medal.

Medalists

Men

Ladies

Pairs

Ice dance

Overall standings

Medal standings

Standings per nation
Starting in the 2015–16 season, the ISU added standings per nation. Points are calculated for each discipline separately before being combined for a total score per nation. For each discipline, each nation combines the points from up to four JGP events. A country does not have to use the same events for each discipline (e.g. a country can combine points from JGP events in France, Japan, Russia, and Slovenia for pairs while using Czech Republic, Japan, Estonia, and Germany for ice dance). For each discipline at each event, each nation combines the points from up to two skaters/couples. The points each skater/couple earns is based on placement. Placement to point conversion is the same as for qualification, with first place earning 15 points, second earning 13 points, etc. In the event ties in the total scores, the country with the fewer skaters/couples (only counting skaters/couples from whom points were combined), wins the tie breaker. If the tie is not broken, the nations will have the same rank.

The current standings are:

JGP Final qualification standings

Qualification rules
At each event, skaters earn points toward qualification for the Junior Grand Prix Final. Following the 7th event, the top six highest scoring skaters advance to the Final. The points earned per placement are as follows:

There are seven tie-breakers in cases of a tie in overall points:
	Highest placement at an event. If a skater placed 1st and 3rd, the tiebreaker is the 1st place, and that beats a skater who placed 2nd in both events.
	Highest combined total scores in both events. If a skater earned 200 points at one event and 250 at a second, that skater would win in the second tie-break over a skater who earned 200 points at one event and 150 at another.
	Participated in two events.
	Highest combined scores in the free skating/free dance portion of both events.
	Highest individual score in the free skating/free dance portion from one event.
	Highest combined scores in the short program/short dance of both events.
	Highest number of total participants at the events.

If there is still a tie, it is considered unbreakable and the tied skaters all advance to the Junior Grand Prix Final.

Qualifiers

Top JGP scores

Men

Total score

Short program

Free program

Ladies

Total score

Short program

Free program

Pairs

Total score

Short program

Free program

Ice dance

Total score

Short dance

Free dance

References

External links
 ISU Junior Grand Prix at the International Skating Union
 Official Youtube channel

ISU Junior Grand Prix
Junior Grand Prix
2016 in youth sport